Otakar Vydra (11 August 1901 – 31 October 1982) was a Czech athlete. He competed in the men's javelin throw at the 1920 Summer Olympics.

References

1901 births
1982 deaths
Athletes (track and field) at the 1920 Summer Olympics
Czech male javelin throwers
Olympic athletes of Czechoslovakia
Athletes from Prague